Order of the Sword is a Swedish order of chivalry created in 1748.

Order of the Sword may also refer to:
Order of Saint James of the Sword, a Portuguese order of chivalry (1170)
Order of the Faith and Peace, a 13th-century military order in Gascony
Order of the Sword (Cyprus) (1347)
Order of the Sword (United States), an honor awarded within the U.S. Air Force
Order of the Sword (Devil May Cry), a religious cult in the video game Devil May Cry 4

See also
Livonian Brothers of the Sword, a military order founded by Bishop Albert of Riga in 1202